Washingtonville Senior High School is located on West Main Street (New York State Route 94) in the village of Washingtonville, New York. It is the high school for the Washingtonville Central School District.

The adjacent middle school was once the high school.

WHS has received accreditation by the Middle States Association of Colleges and Secondary Schools. Washingtonville High School has set forth three particular goals:
1) Students will demonstrate increased academic performance (i.e. achieving mastery rate (85%) on NYS Regents Examinations);
2) Students will demonstrate preparation for and motivation to study at more rigorous levels of learning (i.e. Advanced Placement/College Courses); and 
3) Students will be engaged within a positive social and emotional environment.

In athletics, some of the school's rivals are Monroe-Woodbury in football and Warwick Valley in cross country and track and field. Perhaps Washingtonville's biggest rivalry is with the John Jay Patriots in club ice hockey. Games between the two can attract up to 150 people from each school at Ice Time in Newburgh or the Mid-Hudson Civic Center in  Poughkeepsie.

The school recently completed an addition to the school.

Notable alumni

Steve Cahillane, Class of 1983, Executive President and President of Coca-Cola Americas.
Tony DeVito, Class of 1990, professional wrestler. Wrestled for the World Wrestling Federation, ECW and numerous smaller federations. Was in the tag team "The Baldies".
Benn Fields, Class of 1972, American high jumper.
Dan Gilroy, screenwriter and director best known for Nightcrawler.
Tony Gilroy, Class of 1974, screenwriter, producer and director best known for The Bourne Ultimatum, The Bourne Supremacy, The Bourne Identity, Proof of Life, The Devil's Advocate and Michael Clayton.
Eddie Hawkins, Class of 1980, American soccer player.
Mychael Knight, Class of 1996, fashion designer. Knight was a finalist on Project Runway.
Rich Lee, Class of 1996, director. Lee directed music videos for Eminem, The Black Eyed Peas, Norah Jones, Michael Bublé and The All-American Rejects.
James Mangold, Class of 1981, screenwriter and director best known for Walk the Line, 3:10 to Yuma and Cop Land.
Ralph Mosca, a.k.a. "Roughhouse", wrestled for the WWF and is still actively involved with and now promotes the WWE developmental league in Tampa, Florida.
Scott Pioli, Class of 1983, executive with several National Football League teams.
Naomi Sewell Richardson, Class of 1910, the first African-American graduate of the school and one of the founding members of the Delta Sigma Theta sorority.
Brittany Taylor, Class of 2005, American soccer player.

Notable faculty
David Bernsley (born 1969), American-Israeli basketball player

References

External links
School website

Schools in Orange County, New York
Public high schools in New York (state)